William Swortz House is a historic home located at Starkey in Yates County, New York. It is a Queen Anne style structure built about 1874.

It was listed on the National Register of Historic Places in 1994.

References

Houses on the National Register of Historic Places in New York (state)
Queen Anne architecture in New York (state)
Houses completed in 1874
Houses in Yates County, New York
National Register of Historic Places in Yates County, New York